Wat Khao Wong or Wat Kao Wong or Wat Khao Wong Phrohm-majan (วัดเขาวงพรหมจรรย์)  is a Buddhist temple in tambon Wang Hin, southeastern Uthai Thani Province, Thailand, near the border with Chai Nat Province. It lies in a valley off Highway 3213 and is located southeast of the town of Khao Bang Kraek.

Buddhist temples in Uthai Thani Province